Manitoulin Streams Improvement Association is a not for profit group that rehabilitates streams, rivers and creeks on the largest lake island in the world Manitoulin Island, Ontario, Canada. They partner with the entire community, including farmers, fisherman, and local lake and fish associations.  Their rehabilitation projects enhance water quality and the fisheries resource on Manitoulin Island and Lake Huron which is fed by the streams. These streams were once very productive for salmon and trout spawning, but have been destroyed by centuries of human land use practices.

Manitoulin Streams Improvement Association has rehabilitated 23 major sites on four waterways. These include the Manitou River, Blue Jay Creek, Norton's Creek and Bass Lake Creek. They have also had a class environmental assessment conducted of 184 waterways on Manitoulin Island and identified a top ten priority waterways that need to be rehabilitated. The Blue Jay Creek and Manitou River Enhancement Strategy was completed in June 2001 and approved in December 2003. As of 2010 they are starting work on the fifth waterway, the Mindemoya River. An enhancement strategy for the Mindemoya River was created and approved in 2009.

They installed the first frost free nose pump in Northern Ontario. The nose pump is a cattle watering system that uses a well instead of having the cattle drink from the nearby streams. In 2008 Manitoulin Streams was featured in the Ontario Federation of Anglers and Hunters (OFAH) Ontario Out of Doors magazine when then Minister of Natural Resources The Honourable Donna Cansfield toured the Norton's Creek rehabilitation site while work was being completed.

Awards
 2008 "Success Story of the Year" award at the Bi National State of The Lakes Ecosystem Conference (SOLEC). The SOLEC award was presented by the U.S. Consul General and Canadian Consul General.
 Ontario Federation of Anglers and Hunters (OFAH) 2009 Zone "D" Conservation Club of the Year Award.
 Ontario Federation of Anglers and Hunters (OFAH) Mary Pickford Trophy. Awarded on March 20, 2010 to Manitoulin Streams for their 2009 rehabilitation work. Named after the late actress the trophy is awarded to 1 of 660 OFAH member clubs that is judged to have achieved the most for conservation over the previous year.

References

External links
 Manitoulin Streams Improvement Association

Manitoulin Island
Environmental organizations based in Ontario